Enaretta somaliensis is a species of longhorn beetle in the subfamily Lamiinae. It was described by Breuning in 1939.

References

Enaretta
Beetles described in 1939